Joel S. Schuman is an American ophthalmologist, specializing in glaucoma. In 2020 he was named Elaine Langone Professor and Vice Chair for Research in the Department of Ophthalmology at NYU Langone Medical Center, NYU Grossman School of Medicine, having served as Chairman of that Department and Director of the NYU Langone Eye Center 2016-2020. In 2016 he was also appointed Professor of Electrical and Computer Engineering at NYU Tandon School of Engineering, and Professor of Neuroscience and Physiology and a member of the Neuroscience Institute, at NYU Langone Health, NYU Grossman School of Medicine. In 2017 he became Professor of Neural Science in the Center for Neural Science at NYU. In 2018 he was named Professor and core faculty in the newly formed Department of Biomedical Engineering at NYU Tandon School of Engineering. From 2003 - 2016 he was the Professor and Chairman of Ophthalmology at the Eye and Ear Institute, University of Pittsburgh School of Medicine, the Eye and Ear Foundation Endowed Chair and Director of the University of Pittsburgh Medical Center (UPMC) Eye Center. He was also Professor of Bioengineering at the Swanson School of Engineering, University of Pittsburgh and Director of the Louis J. Fox Center for Vision Restoration of UPMC and the University of Pittsburgh. He was a member of the McGowan Institute for Regenerative Medicine and the Center for the Neural Basis of Cognition, Carnegie Mellon University and University of Pittsburgh. He became a Distinguished Professor of Ophthalmology at the University of Pittsburgh in September 2014.

Research
Dr. Schuman and his colleagues were the first to identify a molecular marker for human glaucoma. This discovery was published in Nature Medicine in 2001. The National Eye Institute has funded Schuman as a principal investigator since 1995.

Joel Schuman, along with Eric Swanson, James Fujimoto, Carmen Puliafito, Charles Lin and David Huang, invented the optical coherence tomography (OCT) technology. This technology, allows a quick and noninvasive 3D map of the eye, in particular the retina. It is one of the tools available for early detection of eye diseases such as glaucoma, along with macular degeneration and diabetic retinopathy. More than 60,000 of these machines are used daily throughout the world.

Awards and nominations
He received the Champalimaud Award, which includes a monetary award of $1 million euros.

In 2002 he received the Alcon Research Institute Award and the Lewis Rudin Glaucoma Prize, in 2006 the ARVO Translational Research Award, and in 2012 the Carnegie Science Center Award as well as sharing the Champalimaud Award. He was elected to the American Ophthalmological Society in 2008.  In 2011 Dr. Schuman was the Clinician-Scientist Lecturer of the American Glaucoma Society.  In 2013 he gave the Robert N. Shaffer Lecture at the American Academy of Ophthalmology (AAO) Annual Meeting, and received the AAO Lifetime Achievement Award. In 2014 he became a Gold Fellow of ARVO. He was elected to the American Association of Physicians and also received the Fight for Sight Physician/Scientist Award in 2016. He was named in Who’s Who in America, Who’s Who in Medical Sciences Education, America’s Top Doctors and Best Doctors in America, and has been named a Top Doctor by Pittsburgh Magazine 2006 – 2016.

Biography
Schuman is a native of Roslyn, NY. He graduated from Columbia University (AB, 1980) and Mt. Sinai School of Medicine (MD, 1984). Following internship at New York’s Beth Israel Medical Center (1985), he completed residency training at Medical College of Virginia (1988) and glaucoma fellowship at Massachusetts Eye & Ear Infirmary (clinical 1989, research 1990), where he was a Heed fellow. After just over a year on the Harvard faculty, he moved to New England Medical Center, Tufts University to co-found New England Eye Center in 1991, where he was Residency Director and Glaucoma and Cataract Service Chief. In 1998 he became Professor of Ophthalmology, and Vice Chair in 2001. He is married and has three children. His wife, Carole, is a lawyer, and his children are Alexandra, in business, Eric, a filmmaker, and Ari, a physician.

References

American ophthalmologists
University of Pittsburgh
New York University
Year of birth missing (living people)
Living people